Mubarak Khwaja was the khan of White Horde in 1320–1344. He succeeded his brother, Ilbasan, with the assistance of Uzbeg, Khan of the Golden Horde and the House of Batu. However, he declared his independence from Sarai. The Khan sent his son Tini Beg to overthrow him. Thus, he was replaced by Chimtay, son of Ilbasan. He may have lived longer after his dethronement, occupying some lands.

Genealogy
Genghis Khan
Jochi
Orda Khan
Sartaqtay
Köchü
Bayan
Sasibuqa
Mubarak Khwaja

See also
List of Khans of the Golden Horde

Nomadic groups in Eurasia
Khans of the White Horde
14th-century Mongol rulers